Gheorghe Dănilă (9 April 1949 – 1 March 2021) was a Romanian actor.

Biography
Dănilă was born on 9 April 1949, in Roman.

Gheorghe Dănilă died in Bucharest on 1 March 2021, at the age of 71. He was buried at the Cernica Cemetery II on 5 March.

Filmography
 (1980)
 (1981)
Blestemul pământului, blestemul iubirii (1981) – dubbing Simion Butunoiu
 (1985)
 (1987)
 (1988)
 (1992)
 (2005) – The Commissioner
Cu un pas înainte (2007) – Virgil Maier #2
Nunta mută (2008) – Ulcior (as Puiu Dănilă) 
Legiunea străină (2008)
 (2010) – The Confessor
 (2010)
Las Fierbinți (2012) – Plopu
 (2017) – Nea Gelu
 (2017) – Nea Gelu
 (2018) – man with a horse

References

External links

1949 births
2021 deaths
People from Roman, Romania
Caragiale National University of Theatre and Film alumni
Romanian male stage actors
Romanian male film actors
20th-century Romanian male actors
21st-century Romanian male actors